Erge Gezmis (born 17 January 1998) is a Turkish swimmer. He competed in the men's 200 metre freestyle event at the 2018 FINA World Swimming Championships (25 m), in Hangzhou, China. In 2019, he competed in two events at the 2019 World Aquatics Championships held in Gwangju, South Korea.

References

1998 births
Living people
Turkish male freestyle swimmers
Place of birth missing (living people)
European Games competitors for Turkey
Swimmers at the 2015 European Games
Swimmers at the 2018 Mediterranean Games
Mediterranean Games competitors for Turkey
21st-century Turkish people